The following churches or similar establishments are named after Saint Barnabas:

Australia
 St Barnabas Anglican Church, Broadway, Sydney
 St Barnabas Church and Cemetery, South Arm, Tasmania

Canada
 St. Barnabas Anglican Church, Allanwater Bridge station
 St. Barnabas, Apostle and Martyr Anglican Church, Ottawa

Ireland
 St. Barnabas' Church, Dublin

Namibia
St Barnabas, Windhoek

New Zealand
 St Barnabas Church, Christchurch
 St Barnabas Church, Warrington
 St Barnabas Church, Wellington

Solomon Islands
Cathedral Church of St Barnabas, Honiara

United Kingdom
 St Barnabas' Church, Balsall Heath, Birmingham
 St Barnabas' Church, Birmingham
 St Barnabas' Church, Bradwell
 St Barnabas' Church, Bromborough
 St Barnabas' Church, Chester
 St Barnabas' Church, Crewe
 St Barnabas' Church, Darwen
 St Barnabas' Church, Derby
 St Barnabas' Church, Erdington
 St Barnabas Church, Gloucester
 St Barnabas Church, Hove
 St Barnabas Church, Inham Nook
 St Barnabas Bethnal Green, London
 St Barnabas' Church, Dulwich, London
 St Barnabas' Church, Manor Park, London
 St Barnabas' Church, Mitcham, London
 Church of St Barnabas, Pimlico, London
 St Barnabas' Church, West Silvertown, London
 St Barnabas Greek Orthodox Church, Wood Green, London
 St Barnabas' Church, Woodford Green, London
 St Barnabas' Church, Morecambe
 St Barnabas' Church, Mossley Hill
 St Barnabas' Church, Lenton Abbey, Nottingham
 Nottingham Cathedral, the Cathedral Church of St. Barnabas, Nottingham
 St Barnabas Church, Oxford
 Church of St Barnabas, Queen Camel
 St Barnabas Church, Ranmore
 Church of Saint Barnabas, Swanmore

United States
 St. Barnabas Episcopal Church (Foreman, Arkansas)
 Saint Barnabas on the Desert, in Paradise Valley, Arizona
 St. Barnabas Episcopal Church (Montrose, Iowa)
 St. Barnabas' Episcopal Church, Leeland, Maryland
 St. Barnabas' Episcopal Church (Newark, New Jersey)
 St. Barnabas' Church (Bronx), New York
 Church of St. Barnabas (Irvington, New York)
 St. Barnabas Episcopal Church (Troy, New York)
 St. Barnabas Episcopal Church (Snow Hill, North Carolina)

See also

 Saint Barnabas (disambiguation)